Axel Williams (born 3 December 1983 in Pirae) is a Tahitian footballer currently playing for AS Tefana.

Career

Club 
Williams started his professional career 2005 with AS Pirae. After five years left Piraé and joined to AS Tefana, who played in the 2011/2012 season in the O-League.

International 
Williams is since 2007 a member of the Tahiti national football team. He played in twelve games and scored two goals.

International goals

International career statistics

References

External links

1983 births
Living people
French Polynesian footballers
Tahiti international footballers
A.S. Pirae players
Association football forwards